The Athletics at the 2016 Summer Paralympics – Men's 400 metres T20 event at the 2016 Paralympic Games took place on 8–9 September 2016, at the Estádio Olímpico João Havelange.

Heats

Heat 1 
18:13 8 September 2016:

Heat 2 
18:21 8 September 2016:

Final 
11:20 9 September 2016:

Notes

Athletics at the 2016 Summer Paralympics
2016 in men's athletics